Karl Friedrich Fries, born at Winnweiler, in the Palatinate, in 1831, studied first at the Academy at Munich, and afterwards under Berdellé. He visited Vienna, and painted there under Rahl; then went to Venice, Florence, and Calabria, where he studied the old masters. He died at St. Gall, Switzerland, in 1871. His style much resembles that of the Venetian painters.

The following are some of his works:

Wine, Woman, and Song; in the style of Paolo Veronese. 1862. 
The Mineral Bath in the Abruzzi. 
Several copies of the Ascension of the Virgin; after Titian. 
St. Barbara; after Palma Vecchio.

See also
 List of German painters

References
 

1831 births
1871 deaths
19th-century German painters
19th-century German male artists
German male painters
People from Donnersbergkreis
Academy of Fine Arts, Munich alumni
People from the Palatinate (region)